Volno-Vesyoly is a rural locality (a khutor) in Dondukovskoye Rural Settlement of Giaginsky District, Adygea, Russia. The population was 72 as of 2018. There are 4 streets.

Geography 
The khutor is located on the Gryaznukha River, 22 km east of Giaginskaya (the district's administrative centre) by road. Semyono-Makarensky is the nearest rural locality.

References 

Rural localities in Giaginsky District